"The Killing Game" is a two-part episode of the science fiction television series Star Trek: Voyager, the 18th and 19th episodes of the fourth season. In the episode, a Hirogen hunting party has taken over Voyager and put its crew to work as living holodeck characters. Their minds are controlled by neural interfaces which make them believe they are their characters, and the Hirogen hunt them in two holodeck programs. These are the 
third and fourth episodes of the Hirogen story arc.

The episode is a work of science fiction set in the 24th century aboard a starship returning to Earth after being flung on the other side of the Galaxy.

Plot

Part I
Voyager has been taken captive by the Hirogen, who repeatedly erase the crew's memories and place them in holodeck programs to be hunted. Captain Kathryn Janeway is put into a simulation of Nazi-occupied France in September 1944. The Hirogen take on the roles of Nazi officers patrolling the town of St. Clare, with Voyagers crew as their prey, members of the French Resistance.

Janeway is now Katrine, a French restaurateur and leader of the underground plotting against their Nazi occupiers. She works with a bartender (the ship's tactical officer, Tuvok), who is loyal to the resistance movement, and a chanteuse and munitions expert (Seven of Nine). Neelix plays a baker who ferries messages and secret codes to the resistance headquarters; he is eventually wounded and transferred to the Klingon program (that the Hirogen are also running) after his recovery. Chief Engineer B'Elanna is a heavily pregnant French girl named Brigitte whose affair with a Nazi Captain allows her access to enemy areas.

In Sickbay, the Doctor is furious that he must repeatedly save his crewmates from their life-threatening wounds sustained in the simulations. He is also distressed that there has already been one Voyager fatality. Ensign Harry Kim, who is being forced to expand and maintain the holodecks throughout the ship, works covertly with the Doctor to regain control of the ship and its crew from the Hirogen.

The Doctor finds a way to release first Seven and then Janeway from their neural interfaces, and the two plan to break the Hirogen's hold on the rest of the crew. Just then, the Americans storm St. Clare with the help of the French Resistance. Captain Miller (First Officer Chakotay) and Lt. Bobby Davis (helmsman Lt. Tom Paris) arrive to take down the Nazi stronghold in the town, calling in an artillery strike to blow up German headquarters. The explosion overloads the holo-projectors' already strained circuitry and blasts an opening from the holodeck into the rest of the ship. Holograms invade Voyager and the ship's interior becomes a World War II battleground.

Part II
Janeway fights off holo-soldiers and Hirogen Nazis to plant explosives in Sickbay. When it blows, the neural interfaces release the Voyager crew and they find themselves immersed in a war, or in the case of Neelix and The Doctor, amidst a group of drunken Klingons. Meanwhile, the leader of the Hirogen captures Janeway and she realizes what he is trying to do. His own culture will never survive with their lifestyle of wandering in scattered hunting parties, and if he could establish holo-programs his people could stay together and experience countless hunts of all kinds. Janeway takes advantage of his wisdom and the two establish a truce.

However, one of the other Hirogen has become inspired by Nazi ideology. He assassinates his leader and aims to conquer Voyagers crew in the spirit of righteous domination. Just in time, Neelix and the Doctor manage to merge the holo-programs, unleashing the murderous Klingons on the Nazis just seconds before they can execute the Voyager crew. Harry overloads the holodecks and the program finally ends.

After days of fighting, a truce is called between Voyagers crew and the Hirogen. The Hirogen agree to leave Voyager in exchange for holodeck technology.

Production

Due to Roxann Dawson's real life pregnancy, her holodeck character had a pregnancy storyline; the rest of the season, this pregnancy was covered up, however.

This is one of the few episodes where Jeri Ryan showed off her vocal range - this time as a singer in the bar.

Cast commentary 

Actress Jeri Ryan, who plays Seven of Nine, said that "The Killing Game" was one of her favorite episodes along with "Revulsion", "The Raven", "Prey", and "Hunters".

Reception
In 2012, Den of Geek listed this as an honorable mention for their ranking of the top ten episodes of Star Trek: Voyager. 
Io9's 2014 listing of the top 100 Star Trek episodes placed "The Killing Game" as the 91st best episode of all series up to that time out of over 700 episodes.

In 2017, ScreenRant ranked the Hirogen as the 10th most bizarre aliens in Star Trek.

In 2019, CBR ranked this the 16th best holodeck-themed episode of all Star Trek franchise episodes up to that time.

SyFy recommend "The Killing Game" for their Seven of Nine binge-watching guide.

Releases 
In 2017, the complete Star Trek: Voyager television series was released in a DVD box set with special features.

References

External links
 
 

Star Trek: Voyager (season 4) episodes
1998 American television episodes
Holography in television
Fiction set in 1944
Star Trek: Voyager episodes in multiple parts
Killing
Television episodes set in France
Television episodes directed by David Livingston
Television episodes written by Brannon Braga